The Christy Clark ministry was the combined Cabinet (formally the Executive Council of British Columbia) that governed British Columbia from March 14, 2011, to July 18, 2017. It was led by Christy Clark, the 35th premier of British Columbia, and consisted of members of the British Columbia Liberal Party.

The ministry replaced the Campbell ministry, when Gordon Campbell stepped down as premier during the 39th Parliament of British Columbia and was replaced as premier by Clark. It maintained power in the 40th Parliament of British Columbia after the 2013 general election. After the 2017 general election resulted in a hung parliament, it attempted to stay in power as a minority government, but fell less than two months later as a result of a successful non-confidence motion on June 29, 2017. It was replaced by the Horgan ministry.

List of ministers

Cabinet shuffles
On August 18, 2011, Barry Penner stepped down as attorney general after announcing his impending retirement from politics. Shirley Bond was appointed to replace him, holding dual roles as attorney general and solicitor general.

Clark first shuffled her cabinet on September 26, 2011, demoting Harry Bloy from Minister of Social Development to Minister of State for Multiculturalism, and moving Stephanie Cadieux into Bloy's old portfolio and Margaret MacDiarmid into Cadieux's.

Clark initiated her first major shuffle on September 5, 2012. The shuffle was prompted by several veteran Liberals deciding not to seek election in the then-upcoming 2013 election. Among the ministers departing were Kevin Falcon and George Abbott, while those taking on new portfolios included Rich Coleman (deputy premier) and Mike de Jong (finance).

Following the ministry's re-election in the 2013 election, Clark again shuffled her cabinet. The 19-member cabinet consisted of nine members who were already in cabinet, seven newly elected members, and two prior-elected members from the backbenches. Among those joining were Suzanne Anton (justice) and Peter Fassbender (education). Coleman, in addition to retaining his position as deputy premier, took the additional role as Minister of Housing and the first Minister of Natural Gas Development. Columnist Keith Baldry noted that many of the ministries that receive the most media attention and coverage would be helmed by new ministers, allowing the government to present a "fresh face" and move on from the Campbell era.

Following the 2017 election, on June 12, Clark appointed a new cabinet. The shuffle was prompted, in part, by the defeat of five ministers in the election and the retirement of a sixth. Five rookie ministers joined cabinet, including Ellis Ross, BC's first elected indigenous cabinet minister with a portfolio. Several existing ministers were shuffled to different portfolios Clark downplayed the changes, describing the government as being in "caretaker mode" and that it wouldn't pursue any new policies, but added "the team reflects the results of listening to what voters told us in the last election."

Notes

References

Citations

Sources

Politics of British Columbia
Executive Council of British Columbia
2011 establishments in British Columbia
Cabinets established in 2011
2017 disestablishments in British Columbia
Cabinets disestablished in 2017